Orlondo Steinauer (born June 9, 1973) is the president of football operations and head coach for the Hamilton Tiger-Cats of the Canadian Football League (CFL). As a player, he played professional Canadian football as a safety for 13 seasons with the Ottawa Rough Riders, Hamilton Tiger-Cats and Toronto Argonauts from 1996 to 2008. He finished his career second all-time in CFL history for interception return yards with 1178 yards. Steinauer was a two-time Grey Cup champion as a player after winning in 1999 with the Tiger-Cats and in 2004 with the Argonauts. He has also won a championship as a coach, winning the 100th Grey Cup as the defensive backs coach for the Toronto Argonauts in 2012.

High school career
At Lynnwood High School in Lynnwood, Washington, Steinauer lettered in football, basketball, and baseball. He graduated in 1991.

College years
Steinauer starred in football at Western Washington University and finished his career with 20 interceptions, 160 tackles, a forced fumble, and 89 punt returns for 965 yards (10.84 yards per punt ret. avg.) and a touchdown. In 1995, his final year, he was a consensus first-team All-American and the CFA Defensive Player of the Year leading the United States in pass interceptions with 10 and ranked ninth nationally with an 11.6 yards punt return average.

In 1999, he was named to Western Washington University's All-Century team and was the only player named to two first-team positions, at cornerback and punt returner.

Canadian Football League
Steinauer joined the Ottawa Rough Riders of the CFL in 1996, but saw minimal playing time prior to the team's dissolution at the end of that season. In 1997, with the Hamilton Tiger-Cats, he emerged as a defensive star, earning a spot on the East Division All-Star team. He was also a punt returner. Steinauer's performance in Hamilton (1997–1999) and Toronto (2001–2008) was well regarded; he was named a divisional All-Star six times and CFL All-Star five times.

Toronto released him on August 25, 2008, prior to the ninth game of the season. As a CFL player with more than six years experience, playing more than eight games would have guaranteed his salary for the remainder of the year. At the time of his retirement, Steinauer was the last active player in CFL history to play for the Ottawa Rough Riders.

He was inducted into the Canadian Football Hall of Fame as a player in 2021.

Post-playing career
After being released by the Argonauts, he was approached by Rogers Sportsnet to work as a football analyst for their broadcasts. Steinauer says that, as a player, football reporters told him he'd make a good broadcaster but he never thought about it until the opportunity presented itself. In 2009, he did analysis for Sportsnet's television broadcasts and the radio Fan 590.

Coaching career

Toronto Argonauts 
On February 19, 2010, Steinauer was hired by the Argonauts as their defensive backs coach. On August 4, 2011, Steinauer was promoted to defensive co-ordinator of the Argonauts after the firing of Chip Garber from that position. On December 8, 2011, new head coach Scott Milanovich announced that Steinauer would be retained as the team's defensive backs coach.

Hamilton Tiger-Cats 
On January 3, 2013, Steinauer was named the defensive coordinator for the Hamilton Tiger-Cats. Steinauer coached with the Ti-Cats for four seasons. By the end of the 2016 season he was considered one of the leading candidates for a head-coaching position in the CFL.

Fresno State Bulldogs 
On December 14, 2016 Steinauer announced that he would be leaving the CFL and heading south to become the defensive coordinator for the Fresno State Bulldogs.

Hamilton Tiger-Cats (II) 
After one season with the Bulldogs, Steinauer returned to the CFL and Hamilton Tiger-Cats on February 22, 2018, as an assistant head coach to June Jones for the 2018 season. With the Toronto Argonauts and BC Lions both looking at Steinauer for their head coaching vacancies for the 2019 CFL season, the Tiger-Cats and Jones decided to name Steinauer as the 26th Head Coach of the Tiger-Cats on December 3, 2018. He tied the CFL record for wins by a rookie head coach as the Tiger-Cats finished with a 15 win and 3 loss record.

Due to the cancellation of the 2020 CFL season, Steinauer did not coach in 2020. In his second season, the Tiger-Cats began the season with an 0–2 record, but finished 8–4 in a pandemic-shortened season to finish second in the East. The Tiger-Cats defeated the Montreal Alouettes and Toronto Argonauts in the playoffs as Steinauer led the team to their second consecutive Grey Cup appearance. However, he suffered his second championship loss as a head coach as the Tiger-Cats lost the 108th Grey Cup game to the Winnipeg Blue Bombers. Following the season, Steinauer was named president of football operations, in addition to his duties as head coach, on December 24, 2021.

Head coaching record

References

Further reading

External links
 Hamilton Tiger-Cats page

1973 births
American players of Canadian football
Canadian football defensive backs
Hamilton Tiger-Cats players
Hamilton Tiger-Cats coaches
Living people
Ottawa Rough Riders players
People from Oakville, Ontario
Players of Canadian football from Seattle
Toronto Argonauts players
Western Washington Vikings football players
Canadian Football Hall of Fame inductees